The Minnesota Housing Finance Agency (MHFA) is an agency of the State of Minnesota tasked with reducing and/or eliminating homelessness, increasing home ownership for minorities, and increasing and preserving affordable housing.

The Minnesota Housing Finance Agency is proud of its record of addressing Minnesota's basic housing needs and helping build stronger communities. Since MHFA's creation in 1971, it has assisted more than 400,000 households by providing funding for a variety of housing needs. They help people buy their first homes or fix up their existing homes. They help build and fix up affordable apartments, single family homes, shelters, and transitional and supportive housing. They work cooperatively with others to revitalize older neighborhoods and communities, build new housing around the state for a growing work force, and preserve the stock of federally assisted rental housing.

In December 2018, Governor-elect Tim Walz nominated Jennifer Ho to serve as director of the Minnesota Housing Finance Agency.

References

External links
 

Public housing in the United States
Housing Finance Agency
Housing finance agencies of the United States
1971 establishments in Minnesota
Housing in Minnesota